Steger Design, Inc is a privately held maker of winter boots and moccasins based in Ely, Minnesota. The brand Steger Mukluks was founded in 1986 by Patti Steger when friends came to her with their own piece of leather to be made into mukluk boots.

References

External links
Official website

Manufacturing companies established in 1986
Manufacturing companies based in Minnesota
Sporting goods manufacturers of the United States
Shoe companies of the United States
1986 establishments in Minnesota